Ludwinowo may refer to the following places:
Ludwinowo, Kuyavian-Pomeranian Voivodeship (north-central Poland)
Ludwinowo, Hajnówka County in Podlaskie Voivodeship (north-east Poland)
Ludwinowo, Suwałki County in Podlaskie Voivodeship (north-east Poland)
Ludwinowo, Żuromin County in Masovian Voivodeship (east-central Poland)
Ludwinowo, Ostrołęka County in Masovian Voivodeship (east-central Poland)
Ludwinowo, Greater Poland Voivodeship (west-central Poland)